Frank Richard Aloysius Jude Maloney (September 9, 1945 – January 6, 2009) was an American writer, editor, and poet. He was born in Seattle, Washington. He was a graduate of the University of Washington in Seattle where he studied under the poet and professor Nelson Bentley. Bentley had been a student of Theodore Roethke and W.H. Auden.

As editor-in-chief of Raven's Mask Press and Bonefire Press, Maloney later published two notable works by Nelson Bentley: A Day at North Cove, Raven's Mask Press, Seattle, 1974 and Grayland Apocalypse, Bonefire Press, Seattle, 1972

Frank Maloney's work is featured in the anthology, The Gift of Tongues: Twenty-five Years of Poetry from Copper Canyon Press. In 1974, Copper Canyon Press also published Maloney's best-known work, How to Eat a Slug.

Bibliography
 How to Eat a Slug, Copper Canyon Press, 1974. .
 The Gift of Tongues: Twenty-five Years of Poetry, Copper Canyon Press, 1996. .

External links 

 Brief profile at PBS
 Brief obituary at Seattle Gay News 

1945 births
2009 deaths
20th-century American poets